The Kongowele is  the highest point in Lindi Region. The peak is located in Matekwe ward in Nachingwea District. The elevation of the peak is 830m.

References

Mountains of Tanzania